Osvaldo Hobecker (born 23 April 1984) is a Paraguayan retired footballer.

Career
Hobecker started his youth career in Cerro Porteño and made his professional debut in 2004. After playing for Cerro Porteño during three seasons, he moved to Rubio Ñu in January 2009. He became a regular in the starting lineup and a key player.

On 4 February 2011, he has signed with the Paraguayan prominent Club Guaraní.

In January 2014, he joined Ecuadorian side Liga de Loja.

International career
On 26 March 2010, Hobecker was first called to the Paraguayan football team for friendly against South Africa, because he constantly played well in Rubio Ñu. Hobecker made his national team debut in which he came on as a 65th-minute substitute for Rodrigo Rojas on 31 March 2010.

References

 
 
 

1984 births
Living people
Paraguayan footballers
Paraguayan expatriate footballers
Paraguay international footballers
Paraguayan Primera División players
Bolivian Primera División players
Ecuadorian Serie A players
Torneo Federal A players
12 de Octubre Football Club players
Cerro Porteño players
Club Rubio Ñu footballers
Club Guaraní players
Club Olimpia footballers
Club Sportivo San Lorenzo footballers
General Díaz footballers
Sportivo Trinidense footballers
Nacional Potosí players
Guaraní Antonio Franco footballers
Association football wingers
Paraguayan expatriate sportspeople in Ecuador
Paraguayan expatriate sportspeople in Bolivia
Paraguayan expatriate sportspeople in Argentina
Expatriate footballers in Ecuador
Expatriate footballers in Bolivia
Expatriate footballers in Argentina